Cássia Eller ao Vivo (In English: "Cássia Eller Live") is an album by Brazilian singer Cássia Eller, released in 1996. This album is also known by the name Violões. It was recorded live in the Canecão theater in Rio de Janeiro in October 1995 and in the Tom Brasil in São Paulo in December 1995.

Track listing
"E.C.T."
"Nenhum Roberto"
"Eu Sou Neguinha"
"Nós"
"1º de Julho"
"Na Cadência do Samba"
"Por Enquanto"
"Try A Little Tenderness"
"Malandragem"
"Não Amo Ninguém"
"Música Urbana 2"
"Socorro"
"Metrô Linha 743"
"Coronel Antonio Bento"

References 

Cássia Eller albums
1996 debut albums